Cynthia Michele Kereluk (born January 9, 1962) is a Canadian fitness and exercise guru from British Columbia, Canada. She won the title of Miss Canada in 1984 and went on to compete in the Miss Universe pageant that year. From 1985 to 2000, she hosted the exercise program Everyday Workout.

Early life and education 
She is a native of Saskatoon and was adopted at birth. She was adopted by her mother, Elizabeth. Elizabeth went to the same church as Kereluk's biological mother, who was an unmarried teen when she gave birth. The family moved from Saskatoon to Vancouver, and, later, to Summerland in the Okanagan.

Elizabeth remained unmarried until Kereluk was 12 years old, when she married Bud Kereluk, who worked as a carpenter. Cynthia is one of ten adopted siblings, including Willie, who had polio as a child and who she helped with recovery. Her adoptive mother looked after foster children and mentally and handicapped adults. 

Prior to obtaining her degree in education from Simon Fraser University (SFU), Kereluk attended Okanagan College for 3 years.  In October 1982, she moved to Edmonton, Alberta.

Her interests include weightlifting, judo and gymnastics. In her early years she won two judo championships, and further awards in poetry, story and drama championships.

Career 
Kereluk worked as a teacher in Kelowna after completing her degree at SFU. Prior to entering the pageants, Kereluk worked as an aerobics instructor in Edmonton.

Kereluk won the title of Miss Edmonton. In 1984, she won the Miss Canada title and competed in Miss Universe 1984. From 1985 to 2000 she reached both a Canadian (CFRN) and American (Lifetime cable network) audience through television with her exercise program, Everyday Workout. At the time, Everyday Workout's sale to Lifetime was the second largest U.S. sale of an Edmonton-produced television program. Kereluk contributed the fitness program for Chantal Jakel and Denise Hamilton's 1999 cookbook, Fit to Cook.

Kereluk has had small parts in three movies; Mark of Cain (1985, aka Identity Crisis), The Pink Chiquitas (1986), and Overnight  (1985 film).

Personal life 
Kerulek's father, Ben, died in 1985. Her mother, Elizabeth, died in 1981.

On September 24, 2007 Kereluk married English rock singer-songwriter Paul Rodgers, best known for being a member of Free and Bad Company, as well as a member of The Firm and The Law. They married, after dating for ten years, at their home in British Columbia's Okanagan Valley.

Filmography

References

External links 
 
 Pageantopolis.com
 Gettyimages.com

1962 births
Canadian exercise instructors
Canadian television hosts
Canadian women television hosts
Living people
Miss Canada winners
Miss Universe 1984 contestants